Velimir Neidhardt (born 7 October 1943) is a Croatian architect, president of the Croatian Academy of Sciences and Arts since 2019.

Neidhardt is a professor at the University of Zagreb Faculty of Architecture, former president of the Croatian Architects’ Association (1995–1999), and a full member of the Croatian Academy of Sciences and Arts (since 1991). Since June 2015, he is also a corresponding member of the Slovenian Academy of Sciences and Arts.

Neidhardt's most important work is the building of the National and University Library in Zagreb.

Major projects
 Hotel Lapad (with I. Kolbach and B. Šavora; Dubrovnik, 1969)
 Hotel Begova Ledina (Makarska, 1969)
 Bit Pazar Shopping Centre (with I. Franić; Skopje, 1970)
 Shopping Centre (Mrkonjić Grad, 1972)
 City Centre (with Lj. Lulić and J. Nosso; Banja Luka, 1973–79)
 New Zagreb City Centre (with L. Schwerer and B. Velnić; 1971)
 French Republic Square (with I. Franić; Zagreb, 1977)
 Hamma Centre (with Z. Krznarić; Algiers, 1984)
 Telecommunications Building (Šibenik, 1980)
 National and University Library (with M. Hržić, Z. Krznarić and D. Mance; Zagreb, 1978–95)
 Zagreb urban axis (1981–85)
 Ina Trgovina Building (Zagreb, 1985–89)
 Exportdrvo Office Building (Zagreb, 1985)
 Adriatic Pipeline Headquarters (Zagreb, 1989–91)
 World Trade Centre (with Z. Krznarić and D. Mance; Zagreb, 1991)
 Metropolitan axis (with Z. Krznarić and D. Mance; Zagreb, 1992)
 St. John the Evangelist Church (Zagreb, 1991)
 Parish Church (Zagreb, 1994)
 Badel City Block (with M. Begović and D. Mance; Zagreb, 1992–96)
 Croatian Government Centre (Zagreb, 1996)

References

Bibliography

External links
 

1943 births
Living people
Architects from Zagreb
Faculty of Architecture, University of Zagreb alumni
Academic staff of the University of Zagreb
Members of the Croatian Academy of Sciences and Arts
Members of the Slovenian Academy of Sciences and Arts
Croatian people of German descent